Velhe taluka (Vēlhē tālukā), is a taluka in Haveli subdivision of Pune district of state of Maharashtra in India.

See also
Mangdari
vagdara
 Talukas in Pune districtvelhe
Madheghat
varoti

•antroli, jhakhani mata mandhir

References

Talukas in Pune district
Talukas in Maharashtra